Scott Pilgrim vs. the World is a 2010 romantic action comedy film co-written, produced, and directed by Edgar Wright, based on the graphic novel series Scott Pilgrim by Bryan Lee O'Malley. It stars Michael Cera as Scott Pilgrim, a slacker musician who is trying to win a competition to get a record deal while also battling the seven evil exes of his newest girlfriend Ramona Flowers, played by Mary Elizabeth Winstead.

A film adaptation of the comics was proposed following the release of the first volume, and Wright was attached to the project early. Filming began in March 2009 in Toronto and wrapped that August. The film premiered after a panel discussion at the San Diego Comic-Con International on July 22, 2010, and received a wide release in North America on August 13. It was re-released for its 10th anniversary in the United Kingdom on August 21, 2020, and the United States on April 30, 2021.

The film uses famous features of its Toronto setting and matches the style of video game and comic book imagery. It used real musical artists, including Beck and Metric, as a basis for each fictional group in the battle of the bands plot, with some of the actors also performing. A combination of digital and physical methods were used to create the extensive visual effects.

Despite becoming a box-office bomb that failed to recoup its $85 million production budget, Scott Pilgrim vs. the World received positive reviews from critics, who noted its visual style and humor, and it eventually garnered a cult following. The film has made several top ten lists and received over 70 awards and nominations, and was shortlisted for the Best Visual Effects category at the 83rd Academy Awards. In scholarly analysis, it has been widely discussed as a transmedia narrative.

Plot

In Toronto, 22-year-old Scott Pilgrim is a bassist for his unsuccessful indie garage band Sex Bob-Omb. He is dating Knives Chau, a 17-year-old high-school student, much to the disapproval of his friends in the band, his roommate Wallace Wells, and his younger sister Stacey Pilgrim. Scott meets an American Amazon delivery girl, Ramona Flowers, after having first seen her in a dream. He loses interest in Knives, but does not break up with her before pursuing Ramona. When Sex Bob-Omb plays in a battle of the bands sponsored by record executive Gideon Graves, Scott is attacked by Ramona's ex-boyfriend Matthew Patel. Scott defeats Patel and learns that, in order to date Ramona, he must defeat her remaining six evil exes.

Scott finally breaks up with Knives, who blames Ramona and swears to win him back. Meanwhile, Scott proceeds to get attacked by, and defeats, the next three of Ramona's exes: Hollywood actor and skateboarder Lucas Lee, super-powered vegan Todd Ingram, and lesbian ninja Roxy Richter, while also confronting his own ex, pop star Envy Adams. However, Scott grows frustrated during the process, and after an outburst regarding Ramona's dating history, she breaks up with him.

At the next battle of the bands, Sex Bob-Omb defeats Ramona's fifth and sixth evil exes, twins Kyle and Ken Katayanagi, earning Scott an extra life. Despite this, Ramona appears to get back with her seventh evil ex, Gideon. Sex Bob-Omb accepts Gideon's record deal, except for Scott, who quits the band in protest. Gideon invites Scott to his venue, the Chaos Theater, where Sex Bob-Omb is playing. Resolving to win Ramona back, Scott challenges Gideon to a fight for her affection, earning the "Power of Love" sword. Knives interrupts the battle, attacking Ramona, and Scott is forced to reveal that he cheated on both of them. Gideon kills Scott, and Ramona visits him in limbo to reveal that Gideon has implanted her with a mind control device.

Scott uses his 1-up to come back to life and re-enters the Chaos Theatre. He makes peace with his friends and challenges Gideon again, this time for himself, gaining the "Power of Self-Respect" sword. After apologizing to Ramona and Knives for cheating on them, and accepting his own faults, Scott joins forces with Knives and they defeat Gideon. Now free from his control, Ramona prepares to leave. Knives accepts that her relationship with Scott is over and, at her encouragement, he leaves with Ramona to "try again".

Cast

Production
Scott Pilgrim vs. the World was an international co-production between several companies: Marc Platt Productions (United States), Big Talk Films (United Kingdom), Closed On Mondays Entertainment (United States), and Dentsu (Japan).

Development

After artist Bryan Lee O'Malley completed the first volume of Scott Pilgrim, his publisher Oni Press contacted producer Marc Platt to propose a film adaptation. O'Malley originally had mixed feelings about a film adaptation, stating that he "expected them to turn it into a full-on action comedy with some actor that [he] hated", though he also "didn't even care", admitting: "I was a starving artist, and I was like, 'Please, just give me some money.'" Universal Studios contracted director Edgar Wright, who had just finished the 2004-released Shaun of the Dead and agreed to adapt the Scott Pilgrim comics. Wright had first become interested in making the film when given a pre-release copy of the first graphic novel during the Shaun of the Dead press tour, later saying that "everything that [he] found interesting about the book, and why it felt fresh and unique, was irresistible to adapt." In May 2005, the studio signed Michael Bacall to co-write the screenplay.

Wright cited Mario Bava's 1968 film Danger: Diabolik (another adaptation of a comic series) as an influence on his approach to Scott Pilgrim, stating that he took an "Italian influence, a sense of completely unbridled imagination. They don't make any attempt to make it look realistic. Mario Bava's composition and staging has a real try-anything attitude." Other influences on the screenwriters include musical films like Beyond the Valley of the Dolls, Dig!, and particularly Phantom of the Paradise. The film also takes on elements of style from the graphic novels, including the use of comic book text-as-graphic (e.g. sound effect onomatopoeia), which is described by Wright and O'Malley as "merely the internal perspective of how Scott understands himself and the world". It has been described as both a video game and a comic book film.

Bacall said that he wanted to write the Scott Pilgrim film because he felt strongly about its story and empathized with its characters. Wright said that O'Malley was "very involved" with the script of the film from the start, contributing lines and adding polish. Due to the long development, several lines from various scripts written by Wright and Bacall were used in later Scott Pilgrim comics. The screenplay's second draft, which O'Malley said "became the main draft for the film", was submitted right at midnight on the night the Writers' Strike was supposed to begin in October 2007. No material from Scott Pilgrim's Finest Hour, the sixth Scott Pilgrim volume, appeared in the film, as the comic was not complete at the time of the film's production; O'Malley contributed suggestions for the film's ending and gave the producers his notes for the sixth volume, but stated that the film's ending was "their ending". Some ideas for the film's ending were cut before production, including that Scott would turn out to be a serial killer who fantasized the gaming aspects and that Gideon would turn into a Transformers-style robot.

Casting of the principal characters began in June 2008. Test shoots began in July 2008, with Wright saying that there was a year of preparation before shooting began. He also stopped working on his Ant-Man screenplay for two years during the production of Scott Pilgrim vs. the World. By 2009, casting had been completed and the film was titled Scott Pilgrim vs. the World. The cast spent two months in fight training together before filming, with Brad Allan and Peng Zhang of the Jackie Chan Stunt Team; Michael Cera said that he "got kicked in the throat during the training" and "expected it to be excruciating, but it didn’t hurt at all, which was really confusing." Principal photography began in March 2009 in Toronto, and wrapped as scheduled in August.

In the film's original ending, written before the release of the final Scott Pilgrim book, Scott gets back together with Knives. O'Malley objected to the first ending because he felt it would dilute Knives's character. After the final book in the series, in which Scott and Ramona get back together, was released, and with divided audience reaction to the film's original ending, a new ending was filmed to match the books, with Scott and Ramona getting back together. O'Malley helped write the new ending and Wright called Knives' actress Ellen Wong beforehand, thinking she might be disappointed at the change but finding that she liked the idea. The final ending was shot three months before the film was released; Wright says that it is his "preferred ending". The film was given a production budget of $85–90 million, an amount offset by tax rebates that resulted in a final cost of around $60 million. Universal fronted $60 million of the pre-rebate budget. O'Malley's commentary track was recorded on August 14, 2010, one day after the film's theatrical release.

Setting

One of the producers, Miles Dale, said that the film is "the biggest movie ever identifiably set in Toronto." The film features notable Toronto locations Casa Loma, St. Michael's College School, Sonic Boom, the Toronto Public Library Wychwood Library, a Goodwill location on St. Clair West, a Second Cup, a Pizza Pizza, Lee's Palace, and Artscape Wychwood Barns. The production planned to set the film in Toronto because, in Dale's words, "the books are super-specific in their local details" and director Wright wanted to use the imagery from the books, so Universal Studios had no plans to alter the setting. Dale stated that "Bathurst Street is practically the cerebral cortex of Scott Pilgrim". David Fleischer of Torontoist wrote that though films set in New York City show off all the major landmarks, "Scott Pilgrim revels in the simplicity" of everyday locations that are still identifiably Toronto, like the Bathurst/Bloor intersection and a single Pizza Pizza restaurant.

Director Wright, who lived in the city for a year before making the film, said that "as a British filmmaker making [his] first film outside the UK, [he] wouldn't want anyone to give [him] demerits for getting the location wrong", sticking to the real Toronto and "shooting even the most banal of locations" in the comic. Wright said that the first thing he did when he arrived in Toronto was to tour all of the locations with O'Malley, saying that this gave him a "kind of touch down at the real locations [that] just made everything feel right", though O'Malley could not remember the exact spots of some and so they drove around using his comic reference photos to find them. The production was allowed to film in Second Cup and Pizza Pizza locations, with Wright saying that using them instead of Starbucks "just felt right" because "it means something to Canadian audiences and people in international audiences just think [they] made [Pizza Pizza] up [them]selves. It sounds like a cute movie brand".

Wright said that he took pride in having been able to record the original Lee's Palace mural before it was taken down; he also had the old bar reconstructed on a set for interior scenes, which was positively received when the bands consulting for the film visited. Wright suggested that "they wanted it preserved as a museum piece". Another reconstruction was the Rock It club, which no longer existed, with the interior built on a sound stage. The Sonic Boom store had been changed from how it appeared in the comics, but allowed its interior to be restored to the previous look for filming. The backgrounds were also changed for the film: many landscapes were simplified in post-production to emulate the drawing style in the comics, including removing many trees from the scenes shot at Hillcrest Park and Turner Road.

Casa Loma has served as a movie set for many different productions, and so appearing in Scott Pilgrim vs. the World as itself being a movie set was described as "very trippy". The scene at Casa Loma also shows the CN Tower and Baldwin Steps, with Don McKellar (who played the director in the scene) reporting that "people were going crazy" at opening night in Toronto when it played. The Casa Loma fight is in the original comic book, but the moment when Scott Pilgrim is pushed through a matte painting generic cityscape to reveal the CN Tower was only added for the film. In his chapter, '"Scott Pilgrim Gets It Together": The Cultural Crossovers of Bryan Lee O'Malley', Mark Berninger calls this reveal "an ironic reference to the specific filmic location" and says that it is "entirely in line with O'Malley's use of metafictional commentary to stress transnational hybridity precisely by highlighting Canadian identity".

Casting

Casting took place between 2008 and 2010, involving director Wright and casting directors Jennifer Euston, Allison Jones, and Robin D. Cook. Cera was cast in March 2008 and Winstead in May. By the end of 2008, Whitman, Wong, and Kendrick were cast; in January 2009, Routh, Evans, and Larson were announced together, with Webber, Pill, Simmons, and Bhabha added around the same time. Extras casting in Toronto began in February 2009. Though based on a graphic novel about a musician, experts and reviewers consider the film to be a comic book adaptation and a superhero film, and in the years after its release commenters noted that the film features an all-star cast of the biggest actors in comic book and superhero films, with CBR's Noah Dominguez saying that "Scott Pilgrim vs. the World may have the best of comic book movie actors, ever". Patrick O'Donnell of NME wrote that "notable actors [having starred] in comic book adaptations before and after their roles in Scott Pilgrim [injects] a meta quality to the film's already genre-busting style".

Director Wright felt confident with his casting in the film, saying that "like with Hot Fuzz [when they] had great people in every single tiny part, it's the same with this. What's great with this is that there's people [like] Michael [Cera] and Jason [Schwartzman], and [...] people who are up and coming, like Anna Kendrick, Aubrey Plaza and Brie Larson, and then there's complete unknowns as well". Collider noted that the less-known actors fit their roles well, with Wright confirming that they did not have much pressure to find a lot of big names, adding that "Universal never really gave [him] any problems about casting bigger people, because in a way Michael [Cera] has starred in two $100 million-plus movies, and also a lot of the other people, though they're not the biggest names, people certainly know who they are." He also noted that while some of the actors were more famous when they auditioned, like Schwartzman and Evans, others became more well-known over the time the film was in development, saying that "Anna Kendrick did her first audition for it before she shot the first Twilight. And Aubrey Plaza got the part in Scott Pilgrim before she did Funny People or Parks and Recreation, which is crazy. It shows you how long this film has taken to get made."

The casting decisions were all run by O'Malley during a casting session with Wright; O'Malley was not in the room but was shown all of the tapes. Wright said that he planned on casting Cera while he was writing Hot Fuzz, after watching episodes of Arrested Development, also saying that he needed an actor that "audiences will still follow even when the character is being a bit of an ass." Cera said he was equally excited to work with Wright, "because [he] was a big fan of his". He committed to working out for fight scenes for a year in preparation, earning him the on-set nickname "push-up king" because of how muscular he became. Wright explained that though Cera is a talented musician, they were not particularly looking for people who could already play instruments, with the cast members who could not subsequently learning for the film. Like Cera, Wright already had in mind Mary Elizabeth Winstead as his choice for Ramona Flowers, thinking of her for the part two years before filming had started because "she has a very sunny disposition as a person, so it was interesting to get her to play a version of herself that was broken inside. She's great in the film because she causes a lot of chaos but remains supernaturally grounded". In 2020, Wright and Winstead explained how she had been his first choice after he saw her in Death Proof and because she has big eyes that reflected the graphic novel. Wright said that Universal had suggested Seth Rogen for the role of Scott, as his recent film Knocked Up had been successful, but Wright could not see anyone but Cera in the role.

Ellen Wong, a little-known Toronto actress, auditioned for the part of Knives Chau three times. On her second audition, Wright learned that Wong has a green belt in taekwondo, and says he found himself intrigued by this "sweet-faced young lady being a secret badass". In the 2020 retrospective by Entertainment Weekly, Wong said she did not think she would even be considered for the role because she is Asian, while Chris Evans said that he was approached by Wright about a role in the film and felt that "it was a no-brainer [because he] was such a big fan of" the director, taking the role of Lucas Lee. Other actors considered for Lucas were Evans' future Marvel Cinematic Universe co-star Sebastian Stan and Twilights Robert Pattinson. The actors playing Lucas's stunt doubles are the actual stunt doubles for Evans. Aubrey Plaza, who has a supporting role as Julie Powers, said that "there's a lot of weird, perfectly casted people", citing Michael Cera and Alison Pill as particularly matching their characters. Other candidates for Pill's role of Kim were Betty Gilpin, Zoe Kazan, and Rooney Mara. As well as Plaza, other members of the cast and crew expressed similar sentiments: Kieran Culkin explained that he was sent a script to audition without a character name, but when he saw the description of Wallace he knew the role was for him, and Wright said that the audition of then-18-year-old Brie Larson "blew everybody else away", adding: "[executive producer] Jared [LeBoff] and I both said afterward, 'We've got to cast her'."

Wright says one thing he is particularly happy with is that this film, unlike many comedies including his own, has "a lot of funny women in it", recalling a particular scene he dubbed "the funny lady relay race", because it "starts with Anna Kendrick, then switches to Aubrey Plaza, then switches to Mary [Elizabeth Winstead], then switches to Brie Larson, and it's just Michael [Cera] being attacked from all sides from all the different women in the film." In June 2013, O'Malley, who is of Korean and white Canadian parentage, stated that he regretted the fact that the film's cast was predominantly white, and that there were not enough roles for minorities.

Music

The film is not only physically set in Toronto, but also, according to Allan Weiss, culturally and temporally located within "the Annex and Wychwood neighbourhoods [of Toronto] during the David Miller era", the time and place of a very specific music scene that the film "embed[s] [itself] into [...] not only via Scott's fictional band[,] but also by the appearance of such clubs as the now defunct Rockit[, and] the film's indie rock soundtrack"; Weiss asserts that the film "marks the mythologizing of the cool Annex scene, the transformation of Toronto indie rock [...] into the stuff of adventure", as "nearly all of the major events [...] are connected in some way to this music scene."

The soundtrack features contributions by Radiohead producer Nigel Godrich, Beck, Metric, Broken Social Scene, Cornelius, Dan the Automator, Kid Koala, and David Campbell. O'Malley had written up playlists for each of the comics in the back of the books, introducing Wright to other Canadian bands during development. Building on this, Wright said that the production "tried to [...] find a real band for each of the fictional bands, because usually in music films you have one composer who does everything". Wright and Godrich met with and scouted bands to write for the film for two years. Godrich scored the film, his first film score. Before he became involved with the film, early scripts had the running joke that "you never heard the bands [...] You heard the intro, and then it would cut to the next scene, and somebody would be going, 'Oh my God, that's the best song ever.' That was a joke for a long time", according to Wright.

Webber, Pill, and Simmons, as the members of Sex Bob-omb all had to learn to play their respective instruments and spent time rehearsing as a band with Cera (who already played bass) before filming began. Chris Murphy of the band Sloan was the guitar coach for the actors in the film. The actors also sing on the film's soundtrack. Beck wrote and composed the music played by Sex Bob-omb in the film. The songs took two days to write and record, with Beck saying that "it needed to be underthought, [...] they had to be funny, but [he] also wanted them to sound raw, like demos." Brian LeBarton plays drums and bass for the band on the film's score and soundtrack. Two unreleased songs can also be heard in the teaser trailer.

Brendan Canning and Kevin Drew of Broken Social Scene wrote all the songs for Crash and the Boys. The tracks were sung by Erik Knudsen, who plays Crash in the film. Drew stated the reason behind this was that "[he] knew that [Knudsen] didn't need to be a singer to pull [it] off" because the songs were "so quick and punk and fast" and "it needed to be the character's voice."

Metric is the inspiration for the film's band The Clash at Demonhead and contributed the song "Black Sheep" to the film, by request of Godrich. The clothing, performance and style of Metric's lead singer, Emily Haines, is also the basis for the lead singer of The Clash at Demonhead, Envy Adams. Brie Larson, who portrays Envy Adams, said that she "had no idea [her] body could move that way" when talking at the UK premiere about her stage performance of the song. The music journalist Janelle Sheetz wrote that "Larson's performance is similar enough to [Haines's] but with an attitude appropriate for [Envy Adams]". Envy Adams' film fashion also reverse-influenced the comics: the last graphic novel was in development while the film was being made, and O'Malley said that, though he "would try and distance [him]self from [the actors' interpretations]", he also "gave Envy Adams one of Brie Larson's actual outfits" in the comic.

Larson as Envy Adams provides the vocals for "Black Sheep" in the film, while the soundtrack features a version of the song with Haines as lead singer, per the band's request; Larson was a professional singer and has performed in some of her other films. Metric had been performing the song at their concerts since 2007, but had not released it before the film. Todd Martens of the Los Angeles Times said that "Envy is a caricature of Haines" and likewise, according to Haines, that "'Black Sheep' is essentially a caricature of Metric", like a song emulating their most distinct aspects. Godrich agreed, and added that it "was perfect for this film [because] it's not Metric. It's a shadow of Metric." Routh, who plays The Clash at Demonhead's bass player Todd Ingram, said "[he] can play ["Black Sheep"] really well", but the film did not use his instrumental, only Larson's vocals over Metric, who had re-recorded the track to make it more sinister. Routh spent "three or four months" learning to play bass for the film.

The song performed by Matthew Patel was written by Dan the Automator and performed by Satya Bhabha in the film. Bhabha said that they "[recorded] it at Capitol Records Studio 2, which is where Frank Sinatra recorded a lot of his stuff. And there was Ray Charles' piano in the room", explaining that the musical history helped him to finish the recording.

Wright said that the film's tonal changes in line with representing the different book parts, and for its fight scenes, were treated like a musical film, saying: 

He also said that some music videos were made of song performances, including some of Sex Bob-omb and the sole The Clash at Demonhead performance, shooting the entire song even though they would not be used in complete form in the film; he said they were so good he wanted to get them all recorded so they had it. The Blu-ray home release includes special features, with music videos of the complete performances of Sex Bob-omb's "Garbage Truck", "Threshold", and "Summertime", and The Clash at Demonhead's "Black Sheep". The music video of "Black Sheep" had also been included as a bonus feature with the soundtrack pre-order on iTunes.

Music from the Legend of Zelda video game series is used to open the film, in sound effects, and in a dream sequence. To get permission to use the music, Edgar Wright sent a clip of the film and wrote a letter to Nintendo of America that described the music as "like nursery rhymes to a generation". There are other sound effects and clips from other video games used in the film. Zeitlin Wu writes that the film pushes the graphic novel's video game elements to the limit by being able to include such sound effects.

Visual effects

The film is described as having an "inimitable look" of manga and video game (particularly 16-bit) iconography with bright colors and graphics mixed into the live action; visual effects supervisor Frazer Churchill described the look as "tricky" to achieve, calling the film's style and appeal "very high-tech images with a very low-fi feel". Churchill was interviewed by MTV in August 2010 about the effects in the film. He noted that some of the work was more complex because of a shooting ethic of Wright's: that there should be a physical representation of any post-production effects, saying that "whenever the image flashes in the finished shots – every punch, sword clash or something – those were actually flashes [...] on-set with photo flashbulbs [...] and then [they] add [...] flash with CG. When someone dies and bursts into coins, [they would] empty buckets of silver Mylar so the actors had something to react to."

Churchill described the first fight (Scott vs. Matthew Patel) as "the most challenging". He says this was because of the technical elements involved, like the computer-generated Bollywood dance and requiring blue screen work, matte painting and many stunts. The scene also incorporates the video game scrolling background effect, which was filmed by a second unit over a full day. Churchill added that one moment in particular required much work: "When Scott jumps off the stage into that manga-esque vortex, that's made up of motion picture photography done on-set, digital still photography, and graphics and speed lines drawn by hand from what [Oscar Wright] gave us". Storyboard artist Oscar Wright (also brother of director Edgar Wright) noted that the introduction of Patel was used "to convey the kind of energy [they] wanted, and explore how [they] would introduce the 2D graphic elements".

The third fight (Scott vs. Todd Ingram) had to be adapted from the comic material more creatively, as Todd's superpowers are shown in print by rings, which was handled by the VFX team. Churchill explains that they took inspiration from the old RKO Pictures logo of a transmitting tower. To imitate this they "made the rings feel uneven and have these optical aberrations with color bursts". In this fight, Scott also gets punched through several walls, which was achieved with camera set-ups. The movement away from Todd is shown from tight and wide camera shots, with Cera as Scott being pulled on a rig in the room. The image of Cera was then merged with a digital Scott and a stunt double, who do go through walls.

The disappearing superpower used by Roxy in the film was achieved by a blue screen, with actress Whitman being digitally erased, but there was white smoke and flashbulbs used on the set to mark the appearances. Black smoke was added in digitally, while lens flares were done manually by "just flashing different lights at the camera" for a day to create material. Roxy appears in the fourth fight, where she uses a bladed weapon. Churchill says that Whitman learned how to ribbon dance and used a pink ribbon in the choreography, which was digitally replaced with the weapon.

A new piece of software was written to produce elements of the fifth fight (Scott vs. the Katayanagi Twins); Andrew Whitehurst developed what Churchill called the "Wave Form Generator", and the visual effects team worked with music producer Godrich so they could transform different elements of the music into animations and create visual music. Churchill explained that "the software would convert these sound stems into animation data, so when the band is playing, the graphics and the dragons are moving in time with the music." This fight was storyboarded by Oscar Wright without any comic reference as the film overtook the publication of the books. The 'audio demons', fighting monsters powered by the music in the film, were then created on-set by Churchill using weather balloons.

For the climax fight against Gideon, a pyramid tower resembling one from Super Mario Bros. was filmed on for a week, with Churchill saying it often got hot due to the light effects being used, including the flashbulbs and red lights to represent fire on Scott's sword. The scene also used blue screen and many stunt performers. Oscar Wright storyboarded the entire sequence except for Gideon's glitching at the end, which Edgar Wright thought of during editing and was created entirely in post-production. Edgar Wright also noted that the pyramid tower fight scene was the slowest piece he had ever filmed, saying: "So we were raring along at this amazing pace. And then there was this final set piece on a pyramid. Suddenly, we slowed down to doing ten shots in a day, which is very slow for me. I sat there on top of this pyramid, looking down at these enormous platforms being maneuvered around and I thought, '[Whose] idea was this?' And it was mine!"

Before directing fight scenes with visual effects, Wright consulted with director friends with more experience, including Quentin Tarantino, Guillermo del Toro, and Sam Raimi.

Title sequence

The opening title sequence was designed by Richard Kenworthy of Shynola, and was inspired by drawn-on-film animation. The sequence also begins with an 8-bit version of the Universal title slate and music, which Art of the Title calls the film's "amuse-bouche" and which was designed by Oscar Wright.

Oscar Wright says the 8-bit Universal logo idea was an early decision in production, and that he treated it "like some crappy low-res, low frame-rate FMV you might find at the start of some of those games" from the start. Creating the title slate involved separating the letters of 'Universal' and making them appear pixelated, using a matching spinning globe graphic by film animators VooDooDog, and reducing the frame rate to four seconds (rather than one) so that it appeared "steppy"; an 8-bit version of the accompanying music was also added, which Oscar Wright said "really seals the deal".

Edgar Wright got the idea to have the sequence from Quentin Tarantino after screening an early cut of the film for him. Tarantino told him that the film "needed a title sequence at the start to let people settle in and hint more about what we were about to see". The original opening sequence had the film's title shown over the long living room band shot that comes before the title sequence, which Edgar Wright said was one of the first scenes to be storyboarded, with the cast credits at the end of the film. After an early mockup of the title sequence on AVID, they approached Shynola to create it, as the film's graphic artists (Oscar Wright and Double Negative) were too occupied with the other effects in the film at this point in production and Edgar Wright was familiar with their work.

The AVID animatic, a black-and-white sketch animation with waveform graphics, was described by Edgar Wright as already "giving the film more of a sense of occasion and a very distinct break between the prologue and the first scene that moves the story forward". At this stage, they had also chosen Beck's "loudest soundtrack song" to play over the title sequence.

Kenworthy spoke of his references for the design:

Shynola was also given a selection of references from Edgar Wright, who described the brief as "2001 meets Sesame Street" and showed them the title sequence of Faster, Pussycat! Kill! Kill!, which used drawn-on optical tracks. As with traditional drawn-on-film animation, Kenworthy traced and painted the images. Wright provided musical references as well, saying that they "wanted to visualize the music and have every graphic, symbol, and subliminal image in time with the music — a hypnotic barrage of colour, light, and music. The idea was to have it as if the animation is a manifestation of how cool the music is in Knives' head. That's why [they] end the sequence on her watching, the titles are like her brain is exploding with how cool the track is."

The brief also requested that the opening sequence not use any of the comic artwork, to not spoil the film, so Kenworthy pitched "an 8-bit epileptic eye-fight" and created a mood film using geometric patterns and visual effects from manga; Edgar Wright requested that it should have less overt video game references. Shynola then worked with the music concept, Kenworthy saying that they "hit on making a visual representation of [Sex Bob-omb's] slightly amateurish, raw, garage-y sound. Something that had the feel of a live performance. A lively, colourful, in-your-face scratch film seemed a perfect fit." Working with Edgar Wright more, they chose to have a visual representation of each character and to scratch the appropriate number of 'X' marks for the actors who played each of the evil exes.

As the film was nearing completion, Shynola had a short time frame to finish the title sequence, so they worked on syncing the sequence and the music digitally at first, visualizing final adjustments before scratching onto sheets of acetate film. From each sheet of acetate, one second of footage was produced. Kenworthy said that after producing the images, they would "deliberately kick [each sheet] around the floor a bit to pick up a lot of dirt, scratches, and hairs".

Printing the sequence involved putting each sheet into a high resolution negative scanner and cutting it down into individual frames before printing onto 35 mm movie film. There was also difficulty with the color printing, with most of the colors they wanted to use being "illegal". During the printing process, Kenworthy added parts of a scratch film he had made at college, which had been used when scanning to check color accuracy.

ComicsAlliance calls the title sequence "just the first in a memorable series of seamless mash-ups of graphics, film and animation that beautifully translate the spirit of Bryan Lee O'Malley's graphic novels to the screen". Art of the Title describes the sequence as "visual napalm", with Bleeding Cool saying it is "quite wonderful". Jade Budowski of Decider writes that "with its rapid-fire introductory scene and the ensuing vibrant animated title sequence, [the film] wastes no time in sucking you into [its] world".

Easter eggs 
The film includes several easter eggs alluding to the comics or for foreshadowing. Fleischer noted that though the comic and film have Scott and Wallace's apartment at 65A Albert Avenue (filmed at 65 Alberta Avenue), there is a reference to O'Malley's own old apartment at 27 Alberta Avenue as the address on the Amazon delivery slip Scott signs. Fleischer also points out the blinking 'L' on a Flight Centre sign on Manning Avenue, which he writes is a warning that a fight is about to happen. Wright said, before the film came out, that a t-shirt of Plumtree, the band that originated the name 'Scott Pilgrim', would feature in the film. Other t-shirts Scott wears include one for The Smashing Pumpkins, a band sharing his initials; one with the bass guitar logo from the Rock Band game series; and one that references Fantastic Four, which he wears after defeating Lucas, played by Evans, who at the time was best known for his role as the Human Torch in the Fantastic Four movies. Scott's changing t-shirts often match Ramona's changing hair color through the film.

There are also references to other media, particularly gaming and comics, with Den of Geeks James Hunt compiling a list of several, including Scott's X-Men patch seen as he rips it from his coat; the Legend of Zelda Triforce represented by Gideon's initials in the film and title sequence (shown above) and the Dark Link-inspired Nega-Scott; Envy's band being named after the 1990 game The Clash at Demonhead (as well as The Clash); Kim dressing in Japanese Gothic Lolita fashion for the final battle as a point of humor; the scene that was shot, performed, and edited entirely like a Seinfeld episode; and using the "this is a league game" line from The Big Lebowski. /Film notes that slow-motion broken glass falling and reflecting Ramona and Roxy as they fight resembles the character selection screen of Street Fighter, and that the Chaos Theater and Sex Bob-omb's forced labor is a reference to EarthBound.

Like The Clash at Demonhead, the other band names reference video games: Sex Bob-omb to the Bob-ombs in Mario franchise games, and Crash and the Boys to a game called Crash 'n' the Boys: Street Challenge. According to actress Larson, The Clash at Demonhead was the first game that comic author O'Malley ever had.

Scott playing the bassline of what he calls "Final Fantasy II" is also considered an easter egg; he plays the bassline from the game Final Fantasy IV, but this game was released as Final Fantasy II outside of Japan in the 1990s because the second and third installments had not been released internationally at the time.

In her adaptation discussion, Zeitlin Wu notes that in the graphic novel, the fourth fight (Scott vs. Roxy Richter) was a frame-for-frame recreation of the introduction to Ninja Gaiden, and in the film, this same frame-for-frame remake is used as the introduction of the final fight against Gideon.

Release

A Scott Pilgrim vs. the World panel was featured in Hall H at the San Diego Comic-Con International on July 22, 2010; after the panel, Wright invited selected members of the audience for a screening of the film, which was followed by a performance of "Black Sheep" by Metric. Three of the ensemble cast members, Evans, Simmons and Larson, were missing from the Comic-Con panel; Edgar Wright's frequent collaborators Simon Pegg and Nick Frost made brief appearances, with Wright joking about them not being in this film. The 2010 Comic-Con was the first time it used giant hotel wraps to advertise, which can be seen from landing airplanes; Scott Pilgrim vs. Comic-Con wrapped the Hilton Bayfront for the event. Outside the convention hall was also a 'Scott Pilgrim Experience' fair, which included merchandise and copious free garlic bread. Winstead reflected that "at Comic-Con it felt like it was the biggest film of all time".

The film was shown at the Fantasia Festival in Montreal on July 27, 2010, and was also featured at Movie-Con III in London on August 15, 2010. It then premiered in Canada in Toronto on August 13, 2010; Plumtree, who had broken up years earlier, got back together for a show at the event.

The film received a wide release in North America on August 13, 2010, opening in 2,818 theaters. It finished fifth on its first weekend of release with a total of $10.5 million ($ million when adjusted for inflation), and by its second weekend of release had dropped to the bottom of the top ten. The Wall Street Journal described this as "disappointing", and Ben Fritz of the Los Angeles Times said that the film appeared to be a "major financial disappointment". Universal acknowledged their disappointment at the opening weekend earnings, saying they had "been aware of the challenges of broadening this film to a mainstream audience"; regardless, the studio's spokesman said Universal was "proud of this film and our relationship with the visionary and creative filmmaker Edgar Wright [...] [Wright] has created a truly unique film that is both envelope pushing and genre bending and when examined down the road will be identified as an important piece of filmmaking."

In the UK, the film premiered at Leicester Square (the Odeon) on August 19, 2010, before it opened on August 25 in 408 cinemas, finishing second on its opening weekend with £1.6 million. In Italy, it had evening screenings in cinemas for a week before being shifted to the afternoon slots; one scholar has suggested that the "flawed marketing plan" that saw it framed as a children's film was the reason for its poor box office performance. In Japan, the film premiered during the Yubari International Fantastic Film Festival on February 26, 2011, as an official selection. It was released to the rest of the country on April 29, 2011.

Marketing

On March 25, 2010, the first teaser trailer was released. A second trailer featuring music by The Ting Tings, LCD Soundsystem, Be Your Own Pet, Cornelius, Blood Red Shoes, and The Prodigy was released on May 31, 2010. In August 2010, an interactive trailer was released, with viewers able to click at points in the video to see production facts. The theatrical poster, noted in Liam Burke's book, "mirrored the opening image of the graphic novel", as a signal to its origins; Burke says that the film's marketing campaign was "typical of the strategy of engaging fans and building a core audience with promotional material that displays comic book continuity".

Cera stated he felt the film was "a tricky one to sell" and that he did not "know how you convey that movie in a marketing campaign. [He could] see it being something that people are slow to discover." Poor marketing has been blamed for the film's lack of box-office success, especially when compared with its positive critical reception and popularity.

At the 2010 MTV Movie Awards, the first clip of the film was released, featuring Scott facing Lucas Lee in battle. At this screening, Pill revealed that Kim and Scott's past relationship would be explored in other media, saying there "will be a little something-something that will air on Adult Swim". The animated short, Scott Pilgrim vs. the Animation, produced by Titmouse Inc., adapts the opening prologue of the second Scott Pilgrim book and was aired on Adult Swim on August 12, 2010, a day prior to the film's theatrical release, later being released on their website.

Home media
Scott Pilgrim vs. the World was released on DVD and Blu-ray in North America on November 9, 2010, and in the United Kingdom on December 27, 2010.

The DVD features include four audio commentaries (from director Wright, co-writer Bacall, and author O'Malley; Wright and director of photography Pope; Cera, Schwartzman, Winstead, Wong, and Routh; and Kendrick, Plaza, Culkin, and Webber); 21 deleted, extended, and alternate scenes, including the original ending (where Scott ends up with Knives), with commentary; bloopers; photo galleries; and a trivia subtitle track.

The Blu-ray release includes all DVD features, plus other special features, including alternate footage, six featurettes, production blogs, Scott Pilgrim vs. the Animation, trailers and TV spots, and storyboard picture-in-picture, as well as a DVD and a digital copy of the film. The "Ultimate Japan Version" Blu-ray disc includes a commentary track that features Wright and Shinya Arino. It also includes footage of Wright and Cera's publicity tour through Japan and a round-table discussion with Japanese film critic Tomohiro Machiyama. It was released on September 2, 2011.

It reached the top of the UK Blu-ray charts in its first week of release.

Simon Abrams reviewed the DVD and Blu-ray releases, writing that the DVD image quality is good and "you wouldn't really be able to notice that there's anything wrong" unless you had seen the Blu-ray version, which is in cinema quality. He adds that "the richly layered audio mix is, however, just as great on the [DVD] as it is on the Blu-ray edition [and] the 5.1 surround English track flawlessly replicates the way the film sounded when it was theatrically released." Abrams noted that some of the bonus features are not particularly interesting, but that the audio commentaries in particular were entertaining and informative.

Video game

A video game was produced based on the film and books. It was released for PlayStation Network on August 10, 2010, and on Xbox Live Arcade on August 25, being met with mostly positive reviews. The game is published by Ubisoft and developed by Ubisoft Montreal and Ubisoft Chengdu, featuring animation by Paul Robertson and original music by Anamanaguchi.

10th anniversary

The film received extensive coverage, a reunion, and a planned re-release for its 10th anniversary in 2020. Sarah El-Mahmoud of CinemaBlend wrote that they were seeing "so much Scott Pilgrim content – it must be a modern classic or something like that!", before acknowledging its improved status after the disappointing box office, and Mashable said that "over the past decade, Scott Pilgrim has enjoyed admiration and salience beyond the wildest dreams of its box-office competitors". Entertainment Weekly created retrospective coverage for the anniversary, including interviewing several stars and people involved in the production of the film. Wright said in the piece that he is "incredibly proud of the movie. The fact that you're not doing a 10th-anniversary article about The Expendables says it all".

In May 2020, Wright announced plans to screen the film again in theatres for its 10th anniversary, some time following the COVID-19 pandemic. The re-release is to be 4K and in partnership with Dolby Cinema, and had been planned for August 2020, but was delayed indefinitely due to the pandemic. In August 2020, Odeon Cinemas revealed that it would be giving the re-release a wide release at all its UK locations from August 21, 2020. The cast of the film also reunited remotely in May 2020 to record Scott Pilgrim Vs the World Water Crisis, a video read-through of the script as a fundraiser for the charity Water For People. Earlier in the year, Cera and Pill had separately suggested a reunion and re-release were being planned for the anniversary. Screen Rant noted that, since the film became much more popular after its initial release, it could become a bigger theatrical success than it had been in 2010.

The theatrical re-release was later rescheduled for North American Dolby Cinema theaters for April 30, 2021, and the week following. Additionally, Wright announced that an Ultra HD Blu-ray release of the film would follow the theatrical re-release, but did not give an estimated release date.

On May 20/21, 2020 (depending on time zone), the Academy of Motion Picture Arts and Sciences hosted a watch party for the film. During the livestream, Wright gave a commentary with trivia about the film and various cast members, including Evans, Plaza, Whitman, Routh, Larson, Wong, and Webber, all joined him at different points to add their own. Collider noted that the availability of much of the cast, invited to take part by the Academy, may have been made possible by pandemic lockdowns. Some viewers questioned why the film was being shown by the Academy as it had not won an Oscar.

The Scott Pilgrim Vs the World Water Crisis video was premiered on Entertainment Weekly's EW.com and YouTube channel at 1:00p.m. EDT on July 20, 2020. Most of the main cast were present; Evans appeared to read his part but was absent for most of the video, while Larson, Simmons and Culkin did not appear and their parts were read by Kendrick, Bhabha and screenwriter Bacall respectively. Throughout the stream, O'Malley, who also appeared along with Wright, drew character images as prizes for donations to Water For People. Cera recreated the sketch of Ramona that Scott shows to Comeau in the film to be given away, too.

Analysis

Scott Pilgrim vs. the World has been widely discussed as invoking a transmedia narrative, using the graphic novel platform, and video game and comic book conventions, within the film. John Bodner explains that "the film becomes an adaptation of a text that is, in many ways, itself a cultural adaptation calling attention to its own source material in its overt employment of many techniques derived from the aesthetic of comic books". Zeitlin Wu writes how the film "[pays] homage to comics, video games, and the overlaps between the two", and notes that its process of adaptation is unique in how it has made a comic book movie that is not realistic, staying true to the original form. In his chapter, "Scott Pilgrim's Precious Little Texts: Adaptation, Form, and Transmedia Co-creation", Bodner notes several elements that create the film as transmedial, describing its references to the comic book and video game media.

Bodner, Zeitlin Wu, and Burke also note that Wright, with the film, became one of the only directors since the 1960s to use, in Bodner's words, "the comment box, marks (action lines), and onomatopoeia text as sound effects" in a filmic work, using such techniques both conventionally (labeling time and place) and unconventionally for the medium. Burke describes the use as "self-reflexive". Zeitlin Wu says that "unlike the 1960s Batman, the use of visual onomatopoeia in Scott Pilgrim seamlessly merges reality and illusion, which seems apt for a storyline in which the two are indistinguishable", using the comic book words within the film as part of the story rather than alongside it.

In the unconventional use, Wright disrupts the realism and diegesis of the film with comic book markers. Bodner gives the examples of: the "[graphic text] 'a b o u t t o e x p l o d e' appearing as an agitated Scott enters the after-party" that "[prefigures] a (nonphysical) fight with Ramona" as a form of label that "externalizes subjective perspectives"; the use of O'Malley's typical ironic authorial voice appearing when a commentary box "helpfully appears to inform [the audience]" that Todd, after seemingly rhetorically saying he doesn't know the meaning of incorrigible, "really doesn't" know the meaning; and the use of onomatopoeia text graphics as sound effects. Zeitlin Wu notes that the film "is one of the only adaptations to incorporate text in such a way that conveys the hybrid text/image construction of comics in cinematic form, pushing their transmediality to the next level", and ultimately destabilizes formal boundaries.

Regarding the onomatopoeia used, Bodner notes that only once does such text-as-graphic actually replace a sound effect (Todd's hair deflating, paired with the word "SAG"), with the approximately 40 other instances having both sound and the onomatopoeia representing it. The function of the comic book technique in these cases is said to be an act of denaturalizing the film form and, per Robert S. Peterson, "to slow the reader down and create greater visual depth and texture to the scene". Zeitlin Wu instead suggests that this was done to further incorporate the comic book nature into the film form, with sound and image perfectly synchronized, saying that "the result is an illusionistic synthesis of image, text, and sound in which words have their own materiality. Each font seems to have its own personality and substance; 'DING DONG' dissolves ephemerally, whereas the letters in 'BLAM!' rapidly fall out of the frame one by one, like a row of dominoes". Bodner adds that marks used in the film illustrate both sound and eye-line, things that can be shown in film without marks, and so are also used to denaturalize the scenes they appear in. Burke writes further on the use of written sound effects, saying that "there are areas in which comics' visualized sound trumps cinema's soundtrack", engaging with Robert C. Harvey to agree that "word and picture can be coupled to reveal the hero's cheery bravado even in the very midst of thundering action".

Another technique that Bodner describes as giving the film its postmodern reading is how Wright seems to alter the film form to reflect elements inherent to comic book sequences, specifically that "[Wright] consistently but judiciously [quotes] panel content throughout the film – generally [...] using the illusion of stasis in film to mirror the illusion of movement in comics". In terms of form, Bodner writes that Wright transcodes the "construction of comic panels" into the film; Wright himself has said that "a lot of people have mentioned [...] how it feel[s] like reading a comic book", a sentiment echoed by Zeitlin Wu. Bodner suggests that this is created by transition techniques, and that the techniques that produce this are Wright's own, building from his work in Shaun of the Dead and Hot Fuzz, adding that they work by "replicating [the panel's] companion – the 'gutter'." Wright is said to recreate this element of outside space in comics in the film form by making "cuts that are exceedingly quick or that open into shots that displace conventional temporal logic (anticontinuity editing), or with cuts that utilize a purposefully barely visible wipe effect", and by using "blackouts, which function as brief moments of dead space" between certain frames.

Discussing the comic book translation in her writing on the process of the film's adaptation, Zeitlin Wu notes that "many storyboards [for the film] were taken directly from the comics", saying that one method of overcoming the temporal-spatial and illustrative-representative differences in graphic novel and film media is to combine the comic panel and storyboard grid. Within Scott Pilgrim vs. the World, she writes that the comic panel-storyboarded sequences "convey a sense of fragmentation, rather than the usual illusion of cinematic continuity" and that "the most effective use of comics as storyboard is in Scott's dream sequences, which facilitate his encounters with Ramona as she travels through 'subspace'." In the first of the dream sequences, "Wright maintains the fragmentation of the comics medium by retaining the divisions between the original panels: the screen fades to black after each frame, an attempt to mimic the simultaneously diachronic and synchronic experience of reading comics". In another example of film panel use, Bodner notes that the static frame shows Scott at the computer ordering a package, the next shot is of Wallace, and the next of Scott sat in front of the door, waiting; Bodner explains that the temporality of these images on screen is not naturalistic, and that they better represent comic panels where temporality can be otherwise deduced by the reader. He adds that, as pastiche, this scene serves a dual function to foreshadow the magical realism that will appear.

In a similar form-bending way, there are two scenes ("the first battle of the bands and Lucas Lee's 'grind' down the rail") where Wright uses high-volume noise to recreate the silent form of comic books, as in a film the loudness drowns out any other sound and requires the use of text in the same way that the purely visual comic book form does. Burke also notes the benefit of visual text when sound would otherwise be "muted by ambient noise", and how (other) "film adaptations often render comics' most loquacious characters mute".

In his chapter "Tell It Like a Game: Scott Pilgrim and Performative Media Rivalry", Jeff Thoss writes on the various transmedial cues, saying that "the film attempts to outdo the comic book series in its emulation of video game features both on the level of the storyworld and on the level of its representation. But as neither of these two works emerges victorious, their so-called rivalry appears less as a real competition than as a way to illuminate the specific narrative affordances and limitations of comics, films, and computer games". Building on Thoss, Fehrle examines the remediation (Bolter and Grusin), or use of imitation, of video game signifiers. Looking particularly at the Scott vs. Matthew Patel fight, he writes that there is "not only [the] remediation of arcade fighting and beat 'em up video games, [...] but also a TV aesthetic [...] as well as a play with some iconic film genres [...] and finally a strong link to the theater as a fifth medium thrown into the mix when we see Ramona on a Shakespearean balcony placed at the center of an extremely conspicuous spotlight". He continues technically analyzing the scene by noting the split screen; Fehrle first sees the technique as "more recently associated primarily with the MTV-aesthetics of 1990s TV", noting that it is "an 'unnatural' editing technique, foregrounding the mediality of film by making visible the impact of an editor, a role which in the dominant continuity editing system is regarded as one that should be kept hidden". Fehrle describes the rest of the sequence featuring Matthew Patel as a parody of music videos, including the "tap dance, which is highlighted by the camera's framing of only his feet, as well as his willfully over-acted Saturday Night Fever-inspired pose", while also mentioning its Spaghetti Western-inspired "through-the-legs duel shot".

However, he also joins Zeitlin Wu in describing it as a comic and video game element, likewise noting the "strong spatiality of the comics medium through its panel layout" represented in the film, especially the "black gutter-like division between the three 'panels'" in the scene. Fehrle added further that its video game referent for the split screen is that of "console video games' multiplayer modes", with other video game elements informing the sequence including "an 8-bit arcade 'bling' sound playing when Patel lands[,] as well as the excessive echo and slight delay on Wallace's voice as he screams 'fight', [and] superimposed text [...] which dramatically juxtaposes the opponents, instructs the player what to do or explains the (health or energy) status of characters or helps players interpret what is happening". He adds that a more obvious remediation of comic books is seen in the O'Malley-like graphic novel drawings that appear to illustrate Ramona and Matthew's backstory. From this multitude of referents, Fehrle describes the film and the Scott Pilgrim franchise as "hypermediated".

The sequence following Scott breaking up with Knives is analyzed in different ways. Maria J. Ortiz looks at mise-en-scène and narrative meaning with the scene, writing that when Scott "tells [Knives] that he wants to break off the relationship, the next shot of her is against a dark background without a realistic reason" and so introduces metaphors that inform the story: "good is bright/bad is dark" and that "the change of background [is] a metaphor for the change produced in the state of the relationship", resulting in the idea that a bad change is a literal dark place here. Bodner looks at the transmediality of the framing used when Scott walks away, matching the graphic novel, with a tree and streetcar bracketing the frame to introduce a solitude of Scott and Knives, particularly with a static camera that represents the panel. In the film, this is followed by characters passing in front of Scott to lead into a wipe, which Bodner says "is common in the film and acts as the inked line that makes the panel border".

Reception

Critical reception
Review aggregator Rotten Tomatoes reports that 82% of 273 critic reviews for the film are positive, with an average rating of 7.50/10. The website's consensus reads, "Its script may not be as dazzling as its eye-popping visuals, but Scott Pilgrim vs. the World is fast, funny, and inventive". According to Metacritic, which sampled 38 reviews and calculated an average score of 69 out of 100, the film received a "generally favorable" response. Audiences surveyed by CinemaScore gave the film an "A-" grade on a scale from A to F.

Peter Debruge of Variety gave the film a mixed review, referring to it as "an example of attention-deficit filmmaking at both its finest and its most frustrating", saying it was economical with its storytelling and successfully incorporated the many big fight set pieces, but missed opportunities to build Scott and Ramona's relationship. David Edelstein of New York magazine also wrote a mixed review, agreeing that Scott "hardly seems worthy of Winstead's Ramona" and saying he thought that "the parade of super-villain exes [...] is like a forced march; [he] felt [he]'d had [his] fill of the fights and there were still five exes to go". Michael Phillips gave a generally positive review, but did agree that the number of fights holds the film back, writing that "Seven sounds like a lot. It is, in fact, two or three too many." Kirk Honeycutt of The Hollywood Reporter wrote a largely negative review, finding the film "a discouragingly limp movie in which nothing is at stake. A character can 'die,' then simply rewind video and come back to life. Or change his mind about his true love and then change it again. Scott Pilgrim's battle isn't against the world; it's against an erratic moral compass." Cindy White at IGN gave a positive review, praising Wright and the film's style extensively, though she did mention that "the middle drags a bit and the ending isn't all [she] hoped it would be."

A. O. Scott, who made the film a New York Times "critics pick", also reviewed it positively, suggesting it was "the best video game movie ever". Slant Magazine's Nick Schager also gave the film a positive review, awarding it 3.5 stars out of 4, with colleague Simon Abrams calling it "the most visually exciting, funny, and emotionally involving studio-produced film of the year" and awarding 4 stars out of 5 in his DVD review.

Debruge praised the ensemble cast and Wright's directing skills that make each of the many characters distinctive. However, he criticized Cera's performance, saying that "his comic timing is impeccable, [but] he's finally played the wilty wallflower one too many times". Edelstein found the film's biggest issue to be Cera's acting, saying that "a different lead might have kept you laughing and engaged. Cera doesn't come alive in the fight scenes the way Stephen Chow does in [...] surreal martial-arts comedies [like] Kung Fu Hustle", with Honeycutt dissecting the storytelling and determining that "Cera doesn't give a performance that anchors the nonsense" of the film. Conversely, A. O. Scott wrote that "somehow [Cera and Winstead] make it work" in selling the relationship without being a cliché, and Abrams said that the actors had "never looked this good, especially Cera", noting that "[his] performance is knowingly affected and self-absorbed throughout scenes depicting Scott and Knives's awkward dating" as the film deliberately plays up Scott's initial narcissism. Cera's delivery of the particular line "I was thinking we should break up, or whatever" has been reviewed as amusing and awkwardly realistic. White wrote that the actors playing Ramona's exes "all [seem] to be having a blast in their scenes". Brie Larson and Kieran Culkin have been frequently described as the film's scene stealers for their performances as Scott's ex, rock star Envy Adams, and Scott's roommate, the sarcastic Wallace Wells. Chris Evans and Brandon Routh have also been called scene stealers in some reviews.

As a negative, Debruge added that "anyone over 25 is likely to find [the film] exhausting, like playing chaperone at a party full of oversexed college kids", remarks echoed by Honeycutt, who called the film "juvenile" and thought "a wider audience among older or international viewers seems unlikely." White gave the film a positive rating of 8/10, saying it is "best suited for the wired generation and those of us who grew up on Nintendo and MTV. Its kinetic nature and quirky sensibilities might be a turnoff for some." Scott also found the youth elements appealing, writing that "there are some movies about youth that just make you feel old, even if you aren't [but] Scott Pilgrim vs. the World has the opposite effect. Its speedy, funny, happy-sad spirit is so infectious that the movie makes you feel at home in its world even if the landscape is, at first glance, unfamiliar." Abrams opened his review lamenting that "the sad thing about Scott Pilgrim vs. the World is that people assumed that because it embraced its niche-oriented demographic's interests, in its ad campaign and in its content, that it was destined for cult status and nothing more."

Schager wrote that Edgar Wright is an "inspired mash-up artist, and Scott Pilgrim vs. the World may be his finest hybridization to date", saying the film has become a "mêlée-heavy video game". Debruge also said that "style [...] becomes the level at which we must appreciate Wright's work", particularly noting the 8-bit Universal logo and the Seinfeld scene. White explains that, though the video game style and structure is non-realistic, "even the most outlandish elements flow naturally from the storytelling". The style was also compared to the comics. According to Phillips, "Edgar Wright understands the appeal of the original Bryan Lee O'Malley graphic novels [...] O'Malley's manga-inspired books combine utter banality with superhero hyperbole, [and] Wright, who is British, has taken it on and won. [The film] lives and breathes the style of the original books, with animated squiggles and hearts and stars filling out the frame in many individual shots." Edelstein opened his review by saying "Yes, this is how you bring a graphic novel to life onscreen!", elaborating that "[Wright takes the] Canadian mangas (in which the mundane meets the superheroic) and concocts a syntax all his own: part comic panel, part arcade video game".

Further comparing the film to the graphic novels, and discussing it as an adaptation, Honeycutt agrees that "Director/producer/co-writer Edgar Wright [...] has successfully reproduced the imagery and worldview of Bryan Lee O'Malley's graphic novel, itself a mash-up of ordinary characters lost in a world of manga, video games, music videos and comic book iconography." White writes that the elements of mash-up in the film's style creates "a pop-culture cocktail that is fun, funny and deliciously offbeat", praising Wright for "[making the comic book elements] work in the translation to live action, and [having] enough respect for O'Malley's work in the first place to try to capture that spirit; Scott agrees, saying that the success comes from its ingenuity in bringing the video game to the player's world, rather than the other way around, and so "the line between fantasy and reality is not so much blurred as erased, because the filmmakers create an entirely coherent, perpetually surprising universe". Abrams also notes that some of the comic elements work better in the film, like when Scott wakes up, followed by Wallace and Other Scott, because of the timing of the medium. He opines that Wright also managed to include additional scenes that further inform Scott's characterization and add humor to moments from the comics. Overall, in her 2020 retrospective review, Meghan Hale of Comic Years wrote that "[Scott Pilgrim vs. the World] doesn't just make for an adequate adaptation,  but instead brings the story to life in a way that innovates the way we look at adaptations".

Popular response 
After seeing the film at a test screening, the American director Kevin Smith said he was impressed by it, and that "it's spellbinding and nobody is going to understand what the fuck just hit them", adding Wright "is bringing a comic book to life". Smith also said that fellow directors Quentin Tarantino and Jason Reitman were "really into it". Carla Gillis, a writer for Now and former lead singer for the band Plumtree, also commented on the film, as her band's song "Scott Pilgrim" was the inspiration for O'Malley to create the series; Gillis felt the film carried the same positive yet bittersweet tone of the song. Several notable video game, film, and anime industry personalities also praised the film after it premiered in Japan, among them Hironobu Sakaguchi, Goichi Suda, Miki Mizuno, Tomohiko Itō and Takao Nakano.

In an editorial for Rotten Tomatoes, Nathan Rabin wrote that the film has a cult following, and in a 2015 Met Film School feature, Danny Kelly listed it as one of the six most underrated films ever, saying it is "a crime" that more people did not go to see it. A 2014 ranking by Den of Geek placed it third on their list of the 25 best underrated comic book films, with James Hunt writing that it "is easily better than any movie on this list. And for that matter, it's better than most movies not on this list"; he suggested it suffered at the box office due to poorly executed marketing and people becoming sick of Michael Cera. In 2020, Evans compared the fans of Scott Pilgrim to those of the Marvel Cinematic Universe, saying they were just as rabid and dedicated; in February 2020, reviewer Alani Vargas wrote that "it might not be so 'cult' today; if you bring the movie up to anyone now, odds are you'll get a very enthused response to it".

Musical artists were inspired by the film, including Lil Uzi Vert with their albums Lil Uzi Vert vs. the World and Lil Uzi Vert vs. the World 2, and single "Scott and Ramona". The music video for Australian band The Vines' single "Gimme Love" is an homage to Scott Pilgrim vs. the World, adopting the visual style of the movie's opening, and Kid Cudi sampled music from the film on the song "She Knows This" from his album Man on the Moon III: The Chosen.

Accolades

Scott Pilgrim vs. the World has received many awards and nominations. It also made the final shortlist of seven films for nomination in the Best Visual Effects category at the 83rd Academy Awards, but did not receive a nomination. It won the Audience Award at the 2010 Lund International Fantastic Film Festival.

The film has been placed on several Top Ten Films of 2010 lists, including as number 1 by Harry Knowles, and on several lists by Empire.

References

Sources

Audio-visual media

Features

 
 
 
 

 
 

 
 
 
 
 
 
 
 
 
 
 

 
 
 
 

 
 
 
 

 
 

 </ref>

Interviews

Literature

News

Reviews

Web

External links

 
 
 
 
 Scott Pilgrim film diary on Vimeo
 Edgar's Photo A Day 2009 from Flickr, with numerous photographs related to the film
 May 2020 watch party at Twitter Listening Party
 
 
 
 

Scott Pilgrim
2010 films
2010 action comedy films
2010 LGBT-related films
2010 romantic comedy films
American action comedy films
American LGBT-related films
American romantic comedy films
Big Talk Productions films
British action comedy films
British LGBT-related films
British romantic comedy films
English-language Canadian films
English-language Japanese films
Fiction about mind control
Films about infidelity
Films about music and musicians
Films about video games
Films based on Canadian comics
Films directed by Edgar Wright
Films produced by Marc E. Platt
Films scored by Nigel Godrich
Films set in Toronto
Films shot in Toronto
Films with live action and animation
Films with screenplays by Edgar Wright
Films with screenplays by Michael Bacall
Live-action films based on comics
Japanese action comedy films
Japanese LGBT-related films
Japanese romantic comedy films
Oni Press adaptations
Relativity Media films
Universal Pictures films
Vegetarianism in fiction
2010s English-language films
2010s American films
2010s British films
2010s Japanese films